Chukwuebuka Cornnell Enekwechi (born 28 January 1993) is a Nigerian-American track and field athlete, specializing in throwing events. He competes internationally for Nigeria. He is the 2018 Commonwealth Games Silver medallist and reigning African Champion in the shot put. He is also the 2019 African Games Champion and the reigning Nigerian National Sports Festival Champion.

Personal 
His parents, Christian and Christiana Enekwechi, are Nigerians from Anambra and Imo State, respectively. He has three siblings. Enekwechi also works as a throws coach for West Lafayette High School.

Career 
While competing for Purdue University, he threw the shot put, discus, hammer and weight. He was runner-up at the 2016 NCAA Championships in the shot put and sixth in the hammer that same day. He was the 2014 and 2015 Big Ten Champion in the Hammer Throw and also the Field athlete of the year in 2015.

While at Francis Lewis High School, he won two city championships, and was the 2012 USATF Youth Champion in the shot put.

Post Collegiate 
Enekwechi threw over twenty metres in the shot put for the first time in 2016. He won his first national title at the 2016 Nigerian Championships in Sapele with a distance of 19.60 m. He chased after the Olympic qualification shot put mark of 20.50 m but only managed a best of 20.45 that year. It was in 2017 that he first represented Nigeria internationally. At the London World Championships, he did not make it out of the qualifying round. He also represented Nigeria at the 2018 World Indoor Championships.

2018 was a breakthrough year for Enekwechi. At the Gold Coast Commonwealth Games, he won a silver medal behind Tom Walsh with a throw of 21.14 m. At the time, this was a personal best for him. Enekwechi then went on to win the shot put title at the African championships in Asaba later in the year. His winning mark of 21.08 m is the African championships record. As the African champion, he was selected to represent Africa at the Ostrava Continental Cup. In December 2018, he won both the shot put and hammer throw at the 19th National Sports Festival in Abuja. He set a national sports festival record of 20.36 to win the shot put.

He began his 2019 outdoor season with a shot put personal best of 21.28 m at the Taylor George Glass Invitational. This mark remained one of the top ten throws in the world until he bettered it at the Grande Premio Brasil Caixa de Atletismo World Challenge meet. He set a new Nigerian National record of 21.77 m to win the event. This record bettered the previous record held by Stephen Mozia which was 21.76 m. Enekwechi represented Nigeria at the 2019 All Africa Games. Going into the competition, he had bettered his national record with a throw of 21.80 m a little over a week before the games. Showing impressive consistency, he won the event with a 21.48 m throw, which is also an African Games record. This made him the third Nigerian man to win the event at the African Games. He will represent Nigeria at the 2019 World Championships in Doha. Going into the championships, he was still ranked within the top ten in the world.

National Titles 

 Shot put: 2016

Personal bests 
Outdoor

 Shot put – 21.80 (Schifflange 2019)

Indoor

 Shot put – 21.20 (Iowa City 2023)

References

External links
 
 
 

1993 births
Living people
People from Queens, New York
Nigerian male shot putters
Nigerian male discus throwers
Male weight throwers
Track and field athletes from New York City
World Athletics Championships athletes for Nigeria
Commonwealth Games medallists in athletics
Commonwealth Games silver medallists for Nigeria
Athletes (track and field) at the 2018 Commonwealth Games
African Games gold medalists for Nigeria
African Games medalists in athletics (track and field)
Athletes (track and field) at the 2019 African Games
African Championships in Athletics winners
African Games gold medalists in athletics (track and field)
Athletes (track and field) at the 2020 Summer Olympics
Olympic athletes of Nigeria
Purdue Boilermakers men's track and field athletes
Medallists at the 2018 Commonwealth Games